P. grandis may refer to:
 Pachycereus grandis, a large cactus species in the genus Pachycereus native to Mexico and just into southern Arizona, United States
 Peromyscus grandis, the big deer mouse, a rodent species found only in Guatemala
 Phasia grandis, a fly species in the genus Phasia
 Pinanga grandis, a flowering plant species in the genus Pinanga 
 Pisonia grandis, a flowering tree species distributed throughout the coral cays of the Indian and Pacific Oceans
 Pleurobranchus grandis, a marine sidegill slug species
 Ploceus grandis, the giant weaver, a bird species endemic to São Tomé and Príncipe
 Promynoglenes grandis, a spider species in the genus Promynoglenes endemic to New Zealand

Synonyms
 Paphinia grandis, a synonym for Paphinia grandiflora, an orchid species native to Brazil
 Pritchardia grandis, a synonym for Licuala grandis, a palm species

See also
 Grandis (disambiguation)